The Junpai D60 is a Subcompact crossover produced by Junpai, a sub-brand of FAW Group.

Overview 
The Junpai (骏派) brand was launched in 2014, and it is a new brand of First Auto Works (FAW) with the Junpai D60 as their first car. Formerly known as the FAW Xiali T102, the Junpai D60 was originally planned to be a new product of the FAW Xiali brand, until the FAW Xiali brand was discontinued and replaced by the Junpai brand. The Junpai D60 received a facelift in 2017 for the 2018 model year featuring revised front and rear end designs.

Powertrain
The Junpai D60 was available with two petrol-fueled four-cylinder engines including a 1.5 liter producing 100 hp and 135nm of torque, and a 1.8 liter producing 136hp and 170nm of torque, with two gearbox options available including a 5-speed manual gearbox and a 6-speed automatic gearbox. Prices of the Junpai D60 at launch ranges from 56,900 yuan to 89,900 yuan.

References

External links 

 Official Junpai D60 Website
 Official postfacelift Junpai D60 Website

D60
Front-wheel-drive vehicles
Crossover sport utility vehicles
2010s cars
Cars introduced in 2014
Cars of China